The 2008 Casinos of Winnipeg Classic was held October 24–27, 2008. It was the fifth edition of the event, and the last with that name before it changed names to the Manitoba Lotteries Women's Curling Classic. 

The total purse of the event was $62,000, $16,000 of which going to the winning Michelle Englot rink of Regina, Saskatchewan. $11,000 went to the runners-up Kelly Scott rink from Kelowna, British Columbia. 

The event took place at the Fort Rouge Curling Club in Winnipeg, Manitoba, and it was the third time the event was a Grand Slam event. It was Englot's only Grand Slam victory.

Teams

A Event

B Event

C Event

Playoffs

External links
WCT event site

Casinos Of Winnipeg Classic, 2008
Curling competitions in Winnipeg
2008 in Manitoba